Ahmet Kizil (born 1 May 1954) is a Turkish diver. He competed in the men's 3 metre springboard event at the 1976 Summer Olympics.

References

1954 births
Living people
Turkish male divers
Olympic divers of Turkey
Divers at the 1976 Summer Olympics
Place of birth missing (living people)